Gabriella Di Laccio is a Brazilian operatic soprano. She performs in the opera seria genre of the Baroque, and in Classical and early Romantic repertoire. Her career spans opera, oratorio and chamber music.

Career 
Di Laccio was born in Brazil and has Italian and Brazilian nationalities. She began her singing career under the guidance of the Brazilian soprano  and graduated with distinction from the University of Music and Fine Arts of Paraná, Brazil. Whilst still at college, Di Laccio joined the Guaira Theatre Opera Company in Brazil and made her professional debut as Barbarina in The Marriage of Figaro. Her early success continued when she was offered a place as a soprano soloist at the Camerata Antiqua of Curitiba concert touring group with whom she performed extensively throughout her native country for many years as a soloist. Di Laccio continued her education at the Royal College of Music in London, where she gained post graduate diplomas in opera performance and as an early music specialist.

Operatic roles include Adina (L'elisir d'amore), Gilda (Rigoletto), Cleopatra (Giulio Cesare), Adele (Die Fledermaus), Despina (Così fan tutte), Zerlina (Don Giovanni), Susanna (The Marriage of Figaro), Semele (Handel), Musetta (La bohème) among others. Baroque opera productions include Platée by Rameau at the Athens Concert Hall in Athens, L'Orfeo by Monteverdi and Dido and Aeneas by Purcell with the English Bach Festival in London.

As a performer of the Baroque repertoire she has sung with the Amaryllis Consort, Il Festino, Concerto Instrumentale, Di Profundis, Baroque Orchestra of Mercosur and Baroque ensemble Florilegium.

Di Laccio is also the founder and curator of the charitable foundation Donne - Women in Music, which makes a positive change and to readdress the gender inequality within the music industry.

Di Laccio is the president and founder of Bravo Brazil – a charity to support free music education and to help deprived children in her native country.

On 4 March 2013 she was awarded the Classical Act of the Year 2012 in the Latin-UK Awards sponsored by Spain's Air Europa. On 11 November 2016 she launched her first solo album Bravura featuring virtuosity arias and instrumental pieces from the Baroque period.

In 2018 Di Laccio was chosen as one of the BBC 100 Women as a soprano and for her contribution through DONNE: Women in Music.

Awards 
 2001: Araucaria Foundation Scholarship Award (Brazil)
 2001: Peter Pears Prize, Royal College of Music
 2002: Richard III Prize for concert singers, Royal College of Music
 2012: Classical Act of the Year, Air Europa Lukas Award
 2018: BBC 100 Women Most Inspirational and Influential in the world 
 2019: Guia Londres Woman of the Year Award

References

External links
 
 
 Gabriella Di Laccio on AllMusic
 Gabriella Di Laccio on Deezer
 Gabriella Di Laccio on Spotify
 Gabriella Di Laccio is musician of the month at Handel & Hendrix in London, accessed 4 January 2017
 DONNE, Women in Music: Our Founder
 Interview with Gabriella Di Laccio on Classical Music Magazine

Brazilian operatic sopranos
Living people
1970s births
People from Porto Alegre
20th-century Brazilian women opera singers
21st-century Brazilian women opera singers
BBC 100 Women